The Excerpta Latina Barbari, also called the Chronographia Scaligeriana, is a late antique historical compilation, originally composed in Greek in AD 527–539 but surviving only in a Latin translation from the late 8th century. The identities of the author/compiler of the original and of the translator unknown.

Naming and genre
The name Excerpta Latina Barbari, by which the work is now conventionally known, is derived from the description of its first editor, Joseph Justus Scaliger. He described it as "quite useful excerpts from the first chronological volume of Eusebius, Africanus, and others, translated into Latin by a senseless ignoramus who had no skill at Greek or Latin." The unflattering epithet Barbarus Scaligeri ('Scaliger's barbarian') may be given to the unidentified author or translator, but is also used as a name of the chronicle.

The conventional name is misleading in that the work does not consist of excerpts. In 1579, the earliest reference to it in print referred to it as an "Alexandrine chronicle". Benjamin Garstad still identifies it as a world chronicle. Richard Burgess, however, argues that it is not a true chronicle but rather a chronograph, which he defines as "a collection of genealogies and regnal lists, usually in the form of a chronological outline of human history, to which or into which can be added any other sorts of texts that relate to chronology, such as lists of important historical events, episcopal lists, calendars, and consular lists, as well as analyses and discussions of that chronology."

Date and place

Greek original
There are many internal indications that the surviving Latin text is a translation of a Greek original. These include its broadly Egyptian and more narrowly Alexandrian focus, its use of Greek sources and Greek holdovers in its grammar and lexicon. This fact was immediately recognized by the early humanists who examined the text.

The scholarly consensus is that the earliest stage in the composition of the Excerpta took place in Alexandria and that it attained its final form during the reign of Justinian I. Burgess dates it to between 527 and 539, the date of the last entry in the related Consularia Vindobonensia posteriora. There is some disagreement, however, about the date of the first stage and about the location of the final stage. Garstad places the original composition in the early 5th century. Burgess allows that it may have been completed in the late 5th century, but argues that the work which was expanded into its final form under Justinian must have been updated already during the reign of Justin I. Garstad believes that the expansion of the original work under Justinian may have taken place in Constantinople.

Latin translation
It is generally agreed that the Latin translation was made in Francia. Traditionally, it was dated to the late 7th or early 8th century, the later Merovingian period. This date was based on the addition, in the translation, of the Trojan legend of Frankish origins. The historian Carl Frick also argued that Latin contained characteristics typical of Merovingian Francia.

The traditional dating went hand-in-hand with the daring of the surviving Latin manuscript. Richard Schöne dated the manuscript to the late 7th or early 8th century. The most likely decade for the translation and the manuscript is the 780s, the early Carolingian period.

The quality of the Latin translation is universally regarded as poor. Comparing it with classical Latin led Scaliger to attack the translator's competence. While the translation is poor even by 8th-century standards, it is much closer to the standard vulgar Latin of the day than Scaliger realized. Earlier scholarship was uncertain whether the translator's first language was Latin or Greek, but it was probably neither. The translator's first language was either a very early form of Old French or a Germanic language. He was probably a student at Corbie without complete mastery of proper Latin and Greek. It has been suggested that he may have had an association with the monastery of Cimiez.

Content and sources
The Excerpta is composed of three sections.

The first part is a recension of the Liber generationis from AD 235. It covers the period from Adam to the death of Cleopatra VII. The version used by the compiler was heavily interpolated and has been called the Chronicon mundi Alexandrinum ('Alexandrian world chronicle') or Chronographia Alexandrina ('Alexandrian chronograph').
The second part is a collection of regnal lists mainly derived from the Chronographiae of Sextus Julius Africanus from AD 211. These include lists of Egyptian, Assyrian, Persian and Greek rulers. Not from Africanus are the list of High Priests of Israel and the list of Roman emperors. Attached to the Egyptian and high priestly lists are a series of literary notices, including the only surviving mention of the "Jewish Homer", Sosates.
The third part is a consularia, that is, "a chronicle that has been created from a consular list". It has been called the Consularia Scaligeriana. It is a version of the Consularia Vindobonensia posteriora that was augmented with other material at Alexandria. In its surviving form, it is therefore "a Latin translation of a Greek translation of a Latin original". It begins with Julius Caesar's victory  in the civil war of 46 BC and ends with the year AD 387. This is not the original scope, however, since the manuscript is defective and the very end is missing.

Manuscripts

Only the Latin translation of the Excerpta survives and in a single manuscript. It is not the autograph of the translator, but the original good copy made from his drafts and thus dates to the 770s or 780s and was made at Corbie. Its shelfmark today is Paris, Bibliothèque nationale de France, Lat. 4884 (or Parisinus latinus 4884). It is a codex composed of seven quires. It is written in a distinct variety of Caroline minuscule pioneererd by Abbot Maurdramnus, who governed Corbie in 772–781. It has high clarity and is easy to read.

The Greek exemplar from which the translation was made was apparently riddled with errors. It was probably a mass-produced copy, one of several written by a group of scribes taking dictation. It was probably produced in the 6th century and written in uncial script. By the 8th century, it had also suffered damage. Originally consisting of nine quires, the eighth quire was lost and when the codex was rebound the back cover was not replaced, allowing the last page to be defaced over time. For this reason, the translation is missing the consuls for the period from around AD 100 to 296.

In every way, the Latin copy is an exact replica of the exemplar. It was probably intended as a "crib" for those trying to read the Greek. There are spaces left for marginal and interlinear illustrations, but these were never filled in. In thirteen cases the captions were added, although they correspond to no images. It is possible that the illustrations went unfinished because the illustrator died. The artist can be identified by the historiated initial P at the start of the text and Lat. 4884 is his last known project. It may also be that the illustrations were never finished because the owner of the exemplar took it back. The owner of the Greek exemplar is identified on the first page as Bishop George of Amiens, who was probably a Greek speaker from Italy and acquired his copy there before he gave, loaned or sold the manuscript to Corbie.

At the top of the first page of the Latin copy, there are competing attributions of authorship added by 9th-century scribes, one attributing the "chronicle" to George (now understood as the owner of the exemplar) and the other to Victor of Tunnuna. The latter attribution was an educated guess based on a monk's erroneous interpretation of the description of Victor's actual chronicle in Isidore of Seville's De viris illustribus. Nevertheless, the attribution was accepted. Two library catalogues from 11th- and 12th-century Corbie list "Victor's chronicle" among its holdings. By 1575, the manuscript had been acquired by Claude Dupuy.

Related texts
Garstad sees the Excerpta as a transitional work between the bare Chronici canones of Eusebius and the fuller Chronographia of John Malalas.

The works most similar to the Excerpta are the Chronographia Golenischevensis and the Consularia Berolinensia. While the Excerpta survives bascially complete (if only in translation), the Chronographia and Consularia are fragmentary. Their illustrations, however, were completed. Structurally, the Chronographia contains the same three parts (based on the same sources) as the Excerpta, but it also includes additional texts. Both compilations probably drew on the same earlier compilation. 

The Chronicon mundi Alexandrinum, the expanded version of the Liber generationis used by the compiler of the Excerpta, was also used by the authors of the 7th-century Chronicon Paschale, the 9th-century Anonymus Matritensis and the 10th-century Annales of Eutychius of Alexandria.

Walter Goffart, discussing the flow of Greek works to Italy or Merovingian Francia, where many were translated in the 6th or 7th century, includes the Excerpta alongside the Frankish Table of Nations, the Book of Synods, the Codex Encyclius, the ruler lists used in the Chronicle of Fredegar and the original model for the ioca monachorum collections. The appearance of a Greek text from the east and its translation into Latin in the west in what is traditionally considered the "Dark Ages" is not unprecedented.

Notes

References

Bibliography

6th-century Christian texts
6th-century illuminated manuscripts
8th-century manuscripts
Translations into Latin
History of Alexandria
Illuminated histories